The Tokyo International Marathon was a marathon for male elite runners held in Tokyo, Japan, from 1980 until 2006.

It actually consisted of two marathons - the Tokyo International Marathon which took place on even years, and Tokyo-New York Friendship International Marathon which took place on odd years. In the inaugural year, 1981, both marathons took place. However, because it was not possible to support two marathons a month apart in the same city, from 1982, the alternating format went into effect. The events were replaced in 2007 by the Tokyo Marathon, a race which is open to general runners of both sexes.

Between 1979 and 2008 there was also a Tokyo International Women's Marathon for female elite runners in November.

Winners
Key:

See also
 Tokyo Marathon

External links 
 Tokyo International Women's Marathon official site at asahi.com
 Tokyo International Marathon at arrs.run
 Tokyo International Marathon at marathoninfo.free.fr
 Tokyo Marathon Write-Up III (registration, training, travel...etc.

Marathons in Japan
Sports competitions in Tokyo
Recurring sporting events established in 1981
Recurring events disestablished in 2006
1981 establishments in Japan
2006 disestablishments in Japan
Men's marathons
Athletics in Tokyo
Defunct athletics competitions
Defunct sports competitions in Japan